Lanier High School is the name of several high schools in the United States. Some include:

Juan Navarro High School, formerly Lanier High School, in Austin, Texas

Sidney Lanier High School in Montgomery, Alabama
Lanier High School (San Antonio, Texas)
Lanier High School (Jackson, Mississippi)
Lanier High School (Sugar Hill, Georgia)
Lanier High School in Macon, Georgia, now part of Central High School (Macon, Georgia)